MIIT could stand for:
 Miit (TV series), an Indian television series that aired in 2003
 Moscow State University of Railway Engineering
 Ministry of Industry and Information Technology of People's Republic of China
 Myanmar Institute of Information Technology (Mandalay)